Paskal or Paškal is a masculine given name which may refer to:

 Paškal Jukić (1748-1806), preacher, musician, and professor of philosophy from what is now Croatia
 Paskal Milo (born 1949), Albanian historian, politician and leader of the Social Democracy Party of Albania
 Paskal Mitrevski (1912-1978), Greek communist partisan
 Paskal Sotirovski (1927-2003), Macedonian astrophysicists

See also
 Pascal (given name)

Masculine given names